Christine Ann Lahti (born April 4, 1950) is an American actress and filmmaker. She was nominated for the Academy Award for Best Supporting Actress for the 1984 film Swing Shift. Her other film roles include ...And Justice for All (1979), Housekeeping (1987), Running on Empty (1988), Leaving Normal (1992), and A Beautiful Day in the Neighborhood (2019). For her directorial debut with the 1995 short film Lieberman in Love, she won the Academy Award for Best Live Action Short Film.

Lahti made her Broadway debut in 1980 as a replacement in Loose Ends, and went on to star in the Broadway productions of Present Laughter (1982) and The Heidi Chronicles (1989). An eight-time Golden Globe nominee and six-time Emmy Award nominee, she won a Golden Globe for the 1989 TV movie No Place Like Home, and won a Golden Globe and an Emmy in 1998 for her role as Kate Austin in the CBS series Chicago Hope (1995–99). She returned to Broadway in 2009 to star in God of Carnage. She also had a recurring role as Sonya Paxton in the NBC series Law and Order: Special Victims Unit (2009–11), as Doris McGarrett in the CBS series Hawaii Five-0 (2012–19), and Laurel Hitchin in NBC's The Blacklist (2015–17). She currently appears as Sheryl Luria in the CBS/Paramount+ series Evil.

Early life
Lahti was born in Birmingham, Michigan, the daughter of Elizabeth Margaret (née Tabar), a painter, homemaker, and nurse, and Paul Theodore Lahti, a surgeon. She has three sisters, Carol, Catherine, and Linda, and two brothers, Paul Jr. and James Lahti. Her paternal grandparents were Finnish immigrants and her maternal grandparents were from Austria-Hungary. Lahti was raised in the Lutheran Church.

Lahti studied Fine Arts at Florida State University and received her bachelor's degree in Drama from the University of Michigan, where she joined Delta Gamma sorority. She studied acting at HB Studio in New York City, as well as completing a two-year professional actor training program at the William Esper Studio for the performing arts in Manhattan.

Career
After college, Lahti headed to New York City in 1973, where she worked as a waitress and did commercials. Her breakthrough movie was ...And Justice for All (1979) with Al Pacino. In the film Whose Life Is It Anyway? (1981), starring Richard Dreyfuss and John Cassavetes, she was cast as a physician who grows attached to a paralyzed patient seeking the right to leave the hospital. Later, she was cast in an important role in Running on Empty, a 1988 movie in which she and Judd Hirsch played the parents of a musically promising son; the family went underground to avoid the FBI after the parents had damaged a napalm factory, and they all must periodically move on short notice and assume new identities. She has also focused on television, beginning with her role in the made-for-TV adaptation of The Executioner's Song (1982). She appeared on Broadway in Wendy Wasserstein's seriocomic play, The Heidi Chronicles.

Lahti received an Academy Award nomination for Best Supporting Actress for Swing Shift (1984), and won an Academy Award for Best Short Film, Live Action for Lieberman in Love (1995), in which she starred and directed. It was adapted from Lieberman in Love, a short story by W. P. Kinsella. Lahti won a Primetime Emmy Award and a Golden Globe Award in 1998 for her role in Chicago Hope. Christine was in the bathroom when she won the third award and finally came to the stage following an attempt by show producer John Tinker to accept on her behalf and an interruptive riff by Robin Williams. In 1999, she presented with a piece of toilet paper attached to her shoe.

In 2001, her first directorial feature-length film, My First Mister, was released. Starring Leelee Sobieski and Albert Brooks, the movie debuted with good reviews. In DVD commentary she applauds the work of her cast and crew, remarking "[I] was very lucky to have such a wonderful crew..." She said she felt regret that the film was rated R, for language, despairing that the movie might not be viewed by teens who would relate with the characters. Also, Lahti mentioned that she would have liked to have had more time to shoot different perspectives in order to facilitate story arc.

Lahti starred in the executive ADA role on Law & Order: Special Victims Unit as Sonya Paxton while the character Alexandra Cabot (Stephanie March) was in appeals. She was in the first four episodes of the 11th season and returned for the show's eighth episode, where she clashed with Alexandra Cabot (Stephanie March). Lahti later guest starred in the ninth and 17th episodes of the 12th season, where she reprised her role as Paxton. Her character was murdered in the 17th episode.

She returned to Broadway upon joining the cast of the Tony Award–winning play God of Carnage on November 17, 2009, replacing Marcia Gay Harden. Both actresses had a few special appearances on Law & Order: Special Victims Unit. In September 2011, Lahti starred with Morgan Freeman in the Broadway debut of Dustin Lance Black's play, 8—a reenactment of the federal trial that overturned California's Prop 8 ban on same-sex marriage—as Kris Perry. In March 2012, she was featured with Jamie Lee Curtis and Jansen Panettiere at the Wilshire Ebell Theatre. The production was broadcast on YouTube to raise money for the American Foundation for Equal Rights.

Her book titled True Stories From an Unreliable Eyewitness was published in 2018 by Harper Wave.

In 2020, Lahti appeared as a guest on the Studio 60 on the Sunset Strip marathon fundraiser episode of The George Lucas Talk Show.

Personal life
Lahti has been married to television director Thomas Schlamme since September 4, 1983. They have three children. Lahti resides in Los Angeles, California, with her family. She also owns an apartment in Greenwich Village.

In 2004, Lahti took part in a protest against the murders of women in Ciudad Juárez, Mexico.

Since May 2005, Lahti has been a contributor at HuffPost.

Filmography

Film

Television

Theater

Published works
 Lahti, Christine. True Stories from an Unreliable Eyewitness (2018)

References

External links

 
 
 
 Christine Lahti biography by Finn Film Entertainment

1950 births
20th-century American actresses
21st-century American actresses
Actresses from Michigan
American bloggers
American film actresses
American people of Finnish descent
American stage actresses
American television actresses
American women bloggers
Best Drama Actress Golden Globe (television) winners
Best Miniseries or Television Movie Actress Golden Globe winners
Outstanding Performance by a Lead Actress in a Drama Series Primetime Emmy Award winners
Directors of Live Action Short Film Academy Award winners
Florida State University alumni
Living people
People from Birmingham, Michigan
William Esper Studio alumni
University of Michigan School of Music, Theatre & Dance alumni